Eternal Spring Shrine, also called Changchun Shrine, is a landmark and a memorial shrine complex in Taroko National Park in Xiulin Township, Hualien County, Taiwan. It is one of the major picturesque points of the park, with the view of the mountains and the waterfall, and one of the main memorials for veterans. 

It was planned for construction in 1958 while the Central Cross-Island Highway was built nearby. It commemorates the memory of 212 veterans who died while constructing the highway (1956—1960). 

The name of the temple comes from the Changchun Falls that never stop running. The Shrine is located right above the waterfall streams.

It has been rebuilt at least twice, after being destroyed by landslides. The most recent shrine was built in 1989.

See also
 List of tourist attractions in Taiwan

References 

1958 establishments in Taiwan
Buildings and structures in Hualien County
Monuments and memorials in Taiwan
Religious buildings and structures in Taiwan
Taroko National Park
Tourist attractions in Hualien County